The Homer Tribune was a weekly newspaper published every Wednesday in Homer, Alaska. It has been independently owned and operated since 1991.

It ceased publishing in October 2019.

References

External links
 

1991 establishments in Alaska
Homer, Alaska
Newspapers published in Alaska
Publications established in 1991